The Communion of Nordic Lutheran Dioceses are Lutheran dioceses that entered into schism with their Scandinavian national churches in 2003 due to what they perceived as "the secularization of the national/state churches in their respective countries involving matters of both Christian doctrine and ethics". These dioceses are members of the International Lutheran Council, a body of Confessional Lutherans, they are in full communion with one another and include the Evangelical Lutheran Mission Diocese of Finland, Mission Province of the Church of Sweden, and the Evangelical Lutheran Diocese of Norway. These dioceses entered into schism with the Evangelical Lutheran Church of Finland, Church of Sweden, and Church of Norway, respectively, though the Mission Province considers itself to be a non-territorial diocese within the Church of Sweden. Their lines of apostolic succession derive from other traditional Lutheran Churches, such as the Evangelical Lutheran Church in Kenya; Walter Obare Omwanza, presiding bishop of the Evangelical Lutheran Church in Kenya, assisted by bishops Leonid Zviki from Belarus, David Tswaedi from South Africa, Børre Knudsen and Ulf Asp from Norway, consecrated Arne Olsson in apostolic succession as the Ordinary for the Mission Province. The first bishop of the Evangelical Lutheran Mission Diocese of Finland, Risto Soramies, was then ordained by Matti Väisänen of the Mission Province of the Church of Sweden. These dioceses have an Evangelical Catholic churchmanship, reflective of the influence of High Church Lutheranism and Pietist Lutheranism in Scandinavia. As such, the Communion of Nordic Lutheran Dioceses affirms:

In the view of the Communion of Nordic Lutheran Dioceses, "it has retained the historic teachings and practice that the politically selected church structure has abandoned, it is a believing remnant of those churches."

References

External links 
Communion of Nordic Lutheran Dioceses
Mission Province of the Church of Sweden
Evangelical Lutheran Mission Diocese of Finland

Lutheranism in Sweden
Lutheranism in Norway
Lutheranism in Finland
Lutheranism in Kenya
Lutheran organizations established in the 21st century